The Cavan county football team represents Cavan in men's Gaelic football and is governed by Cavan GAA, the county board of the Gaelic Athletic Association. The team competes in the three major annual inter-county competitions; the All-Ireland Senior Football Championship, the Ulster Senior Football Championship and the National Football League.

Cavan's home ground is Breffni Park, Cavan. The team's manager is Mickey Graham.

The team last won the Ulster Senior Championship in 2020, the All-Ireland Senior Championship in 1952 and the National League in 1948.

History

Early years
Cavan is the most successful football county in the province of Ulster, having won the All-Ireland Senior Football Championship (SFC) five times, the Ulster Senior Football Championship (SFC) 40 times, and the National Football League once.

Between 1893 and 1899, neither Connacht nor Ulster took part in the All-Ireland SFC. Cavan, however, played in the preliminary round of the Leinster Senior Football Championship in 1895, losing to Louth.

1933–1952: All-Ireland SFC finals
In the 1933 All-Ireland SFC semi-final in Breffni Park, Cavan beat Kerry with a last minute goal from Vincent McGovern, ending their five-in-a-row bid. Cavan later defeated Galway by one point in the final to become the first Ulster county to win the Sam Maguire Cup.

Two years later, Cavan defeated Kildare in the 1935 All-Ireland SFC final to win a second title in three years.

Cavan reached 1947 All-Ireland Senior Football Championship Final after defeating Roscommon in the semi-final. The concluding game was played at the Polo Grounds in New York City, the only time the final was held outside of Ireland. Kerry scored two early goals, but Cavan settled and goals from Joe Stafford and Mick Higgins meant they led by a point at half-time. Peter Donohoe kicked eight points over the hour to seal a famous victory for Cavan on a scoreline of 2–11 to 2–7, to bring Sam Maguire to Cavan for a third time.

Cavan followed this up with a one-point win over Mayo in 1948, to win back-to-back titles. The county reached its third successive final in 1949, but was denied a three-in-a-row by Meath, losing by four points.

Cavan responded to that defeat by overcoming Meath after a replay in 1952 to win the county's fifth, and most recent, All-Ireland SFC title. It remains Cavan's latest appearance in an All-Ireland SFC final.

1970–present
Donegal All-Ireland SFC winner Martin McHugh was appointed as senior manager ahead of the 1995 season. At this time, Cavan had not won a game in the Ulster SFC for the previous seven years. Cavan won the 1997 Ulster SFC final, after beating Derry by a point. Stephen King was captain. Cavan substitute Jason O'Reilly scored the game's only goal. Martin McHugh was manager; he later described the aftermath as follows: "It was crazy, like something you would see out in Argentina. I was worried that someone was going to get killed under the bus, they'd gone mad". Cavan supporters thronged Hill 16 for the All-Ireland SFC semi-final against Kerry, King acknowledging that — despite the early goal from Fintan Cahill — Kerry "deserved their win". After the semi-final, McHugh stepped down as manager having served three years. He cited putting his family first as the reason for leaving.

With Val Andrews as manager, Cavan once again reached the Ulster SFC final again in 2001. A goal from Jason O'Reilly had Cavan leading at half time, but a strong finish from Tyrone meant they ran out winners on a 1-13 to 1-11 scoreline.

Cavan's most notable achievement in the early part of the 21st-century was ending Seán Boylan's long spell as manager of Meath in 2005. Less than a year after this success, Waterford defeated Cavan in the league to halt its push for promotion. Cian Mackey was among several players who were "rested" for the game and not included among the substitutes. The Waterford win was inspired by a line in the Cavan matchday programme that Cavan's defeat would be akin to the "sinking of the Titanic", with Waterford manager John Kiely using this to stir the away team into action.

Mackey later said: "One game turned the whole thing on its head for years. We didn't really recover from that for years, from pushing so close to promotion".

Manager Donal Keogan got the county promoted the following year but league restructuring landed Cavan in Division 2 instead. Relegation to Division 3 quickly followed.

Cavan lost to Antrim in the 2009 Ulster SFC.

The county narrowly avoided relegation to Division 4 in 2012 following a loss by a scoreline of 4–6 to 0–12 to Antrim, surviving because already-relegated Tipperary defeated Offaly when an Offaly win would have sent Cavan down on the head-to-head result.

Under the management of Mattie McGleenan, Cavan's defence was not strong.

Former senior player Mickey Graham was appointed as manager ahead of the 2019 season. Fellow Cavanman Dermot McCabe and Monaghan's Martin Corey joined him. Cavan reached the 2019 Ulster SFC final in Graham's first season as manager, losing to Donegal. In 2020, Graham led Cavan to consecutive Ulster SFC finals for the first time since the 1960s. Cavan won and, because of the impact of the COVID-19 pandemic on Gaelic games, went straight into the All-Ireland SFC semi-final, the county's first appearance at that stage since 1997.

Rivalries
Cavan's biggest rivalry has been with nearby Monaghan. Cavan also shares rivalries with teams from the neighbouring counties of Fermanagh, Meath and Longford. At All-Ireland level Cavan had a rivalry with Kerry. The county stopped Kerry's bid for a five-in-a-row in 1933 and also defeated Kerry in the 1947 All-Ireland Senior Football Championship Final at the Polo Grounds in New York City.

Current panel

Current management team
Manager: Mickey Graham (Cavan Gaels)
Selectors: Ryan McMenamin (Dromore St Dympna's), Seánie Johnston (Cavan Gaels), John Denning (Drumalee)
Coach: James Burke (Mayo)

Managerial history
Cavan often appoint outside managers, including Liam Austin, from Down; Val Andrews and Tommy Carr, both from Dublin; Mattie Kerrigan, from Meath; Eamonn Coleman, from Derry; Eugene McGee, from Longford; and Martin McElkennon, from Tyrone. But Martin McHugh was the most successful appointment, the former Donegal footballer led Cavan to the 1997 Ulster SFC (a first in 28 years).

Players

Notable players

Dynasties
Willie Carolan, from the Virginia club, played for the Cavan team that won the 1905 Ulster SFC. Paddy and Edwin Carolan were part of the 1952 All-Ireland SFC-winning team, which defeated Meath after a replay which was brought about by a controversial Edwin Carolan point. Pady Carolan became the last surviving member of the 1952 team, and thus the last surviving All-Ireland SFC winner from Cavan, when Brian O'Reilly died in November 2021. Piddy Carolan's son Ronan played for Cavan between 1986 and 1999, winning an Ulster SFC in 1997, thus giving three generations of the Carolan family Ulster SFC medals. Niall Carolan, grandson of Paddy and nephew of Ronan, was part of Cavan's 2022 Tailteann Cup Final squad. Niall Carolan started that game.

Records
Ronan Carolan is the team's top scorer in National Football League history, finishing his career with 19–387 (444) in that competition and behind only Mickey Kearins at his retirement (though since surpassed by David Tubridy who became the competition's top scorer in May 2021).

All-Ireland SFC winning captains
 1933: Jim Smith
 1935: Hughie O'Reilly
 1947: John Joe O'Reilly
 1948: John Joe O'Reilly
 1952: Mick Higgins

Awards
All Stars
 1978: Ollie Brady
 1997: Dermot McCabe
 2020: Raymond Galligan, Pádraig Faulkner, Thomas Galligan

Cú Chulainn Awards
 1963: Gabriel Kelly
 1964: Gabriel Kelly, Charlie Gallagher
 1966: Ray Carolan
 1967: Gabriel Kelly, Ray Carolan

Irish News Ulster All Stars
 1995: Peter Reilly, Ronan Carolan
 1997: Paul O'Dowd, Ciaran Brady, Patrick Shiels, Dermot McCabe, Peter Reilly, Ronan Carolan
 2001: Anthony Forde
 2013: Killian Clarke, Cian Mackey, Eugene Keating, Martin Dunne
 2016: Raymond Galligan, Conor Moynagh
 2020: Raymond Galligan, Jason McLoughlin, Pádraig Faulkner, Luke Fortune, Gerard Smith, Ciarán Brady, Killian Clarke, Thomas Galligan, Martin Reilly, Gearóid McKiernan, Oisín Kiernan, Conor Madden

All-Time All Star Award
 Mick Higgins

Team of the Century and Team of the Millennium
 John Joe O'Reilly — Centre-Back
Charlie Gallagher was also named on the Team of the Century of players without an All-Ireland medal.

Colours and crest

Kit evolution

Team sponsorship
The following is a list of sponsors of the Cavan county football team (seniors):
 1992: Holybrook Construction
 1993: Atlanta Conservatories
 1994: Cavan Co-op Mart 
 1995–present: Kingspan Group
Cavan has had only four sponsorship deals since the GAA first permitted sponsors on jerseys in 1991. There was no sponsorship on GAA jerseys until the second game of the Meath v Dublin four-in-a-row in 1991 so only a handful of teams had sponsorship in 1991. In 1992, Holybrook Construction sponsored Cavan's jerseys, although it was only for one game. For the 1993–94 seasons, Cavan Co-op Mart took over sponsorship. Kingspan has continuously sponsored Cavan since 1995.

Honours

Official honours, with additions noted.
Cavan has won the All-Ireland SFC final on five occasions — all five victories came between 1933 and 1952.

Meanwhile, the county has won the Ulster SFC on 40 occasions. All bar the 39th and 40th of these came in the 1960s or earlier. The most recent one came in 2020 after a gap of 23 years. The previous one came in 1997 when Cavan defeated Derry by a scoreline of 1–14 to 0–16. That was the county's first Ulster SFC title in 28 years.

Cavan has won the National Football League once, in 1947–48.

National
All-Ireland Senior Football Championship
 Winners (5): 1933, 1935, 1947, 1948, 1952
 Runners-up (6): 1925, 1928, 1937, 1943, 1945, 1949
Tailteann Cup
 Runners-up (1): 2022
National Football League
 Winners (1): 1947–48
 Runners-up (6): 1930–31, 1932–33, 1949–50, 1952–53, 1959–60, 2002
All-Ireland Junior Football Championship
 Winners (2): 1927, 2014
 Runners-up (1): 1941
All-Ireland Under-21 Football Championship
 Runners-up (3): 1988, 1996, 2011
All-Ireland Minor Football Championship
 Winners (2): 1937, 1938
 Runners-up (2): 1952, 1959

Provincial
Ulster Senior Football Championship
 Winners (40): 1891, 1903, 1904, 1905, 1915, 1918, 1919, 1920, 1922, 1923, 1924, 1925, 1926, 1928, 1931, 1932, 1933, 1934, 1935, 1936, 1937, 1939, 1940, 1941, 1942, 1943, 1944, 1945, 1947, 1948, 1949, 1952, 1954, 1955, 1962, 1964, 1967, 1969, 1997, 2020
 Runners-up (23): 1888, 1908, 1909, 1910, 1911, 1916, 1922, 1929, 1930, 1946, 1950, 1951, 1953, 1959, 1960, 1965, 1968, 1976, 1978, 1983, 1995, 2001, 2019
Dr McKenna Cup
 Winners (11): 1936, 1940, 1943, 1951, 1953, 1955, 1956, 1962, 1968, 1988, 2000
Ulster Junior Football Championship
 Winners (14): 1914, 1915, 1916, 1924, 1927, 1932, 1936, 1938, 1940, 1941, 1944, 1957, 1962, 1984
Leinster Junior Football Championship
 Winners (2): 2012, 2014
Ulster Under-21 Football Championship
 Winners (6): 1988, 1996, 2011, 2012, 2013, 2014
 Runners-up (10): 1963, 1965, 1970, 1977, 1978, 1995, 2002, 2005, 2010, 2022
Ulster Minor Football Championship
 Winners (6): 1937, 1938, 1952, 1959, 1974, 2011
 Runners-up (14): 1939, 1941, 1951, 1955, 1958, 1964, 1965, 1972, 1975, 1976, 1985, 1988, 2015, 2017

References

 
County football teams